İslahiye is a town and the administrative seat of the İslahiye District of Gaziantep Province in south-central Turkey. It is a railway border crossing into Syria. Near İslâhiye is the site of ancient Nicopolis.

The railway station of Islahiye is the last stop on the railway to Damascus in Syria. Since March 2001, a regular train line runs once a week between Syria and Iran via Islahiye.

The state road , which connects Gaziantep with Antakya, runs through Islahiye.

The town is inhabited by Yörüks of the Aydınlı tribe. English traveler Mark Sykes recorded İslahiye as a town inhabited by Turks in early 20th century.

See also
 İslahiye District Public Library

References 

Populated places in Gaziantep Province